Charles "Kale" Teetai Ane III (born August 12, 1952) is a former professional American football player who played center for seven seasons for the Kansas City Chiefs and the Green Bay Packers in the National Football League (NFL), and three seasons at Michigan State University.

Life
He is the son of former NFL player Charley Ane. Now known as Kale Ane, he was the head football coach and assistant athletic director at the Punahou School in Honolulu, Hawaii, where both he and his father attended high school and played football.

Head coaching record

References

1952 births
Living people
American football centers
Green Bay Packers players
Kansas City Chiefs players
Michigan State Spartans football players
High school football coaches in Hawaii
Punahou School alumni
Players of American football from Los Angeles
Players of American football from Honolulu
American sportspeople of Samoan descent